Riverview Cemetery is a private cemetery located in the Woolen Mills section of Charlottesville, Virginia, at 1701 Chesapeake Street.  Founded in 1892 as Charlottesville's two public cemeteries—Maplewood and Oakwood—were filling up, Riverview consists of about 50 acres overlooking a bend in the Rivanna River and has approximately 12,000 graves with room for about 7,000 more.

Notable burials
Some notable people interred here include:
 John Wood Fishburne (1868–1937) US Congressman
 Nicholas Lewis (1734–1808), an officer in the American Revolution and friend of Thomas Jefferson
 Thomas L. Rosser (1836–1910) who was a General for the Confederate States of America and later an officer in the Spanish–American War
 Virginia State Senator Emily Couric (1947–2001)

References

External links 
 City of Charlottesville, Virginia  Historic Cemeteries – Maplewood Cemetery, Oakwood Cemetery, Daughters of Zion Cemetery (African American)
 Albemarle Charlottesville Historical Society
 

Cemeteries in Charlottesville, Virginia